Olivier Freiherr von Beaulieu-Marconnay (1898-1918) was a German First World War fighter ace credited with 25 confirmed aerial victories. A trusted wingman for the redoubtable Rudolf Berthold, "Bauli" was World War I's youngest winner of Germany's highest award for valor, the Pour le Mérite, or Blue Max.

The victory list

The victories of Olivier Freiherr von Beaulieu-Marconnay are reported in chronological order, which is not necessarily the order or dates the victories were confirmed by headquarters.

Abbreviations were expanded by the editor creating this list.

Endnotes

References
 
 Kilduff, Peter (2012). Iron Man: Rudolf Berthold: Germany's Indomitable World War I Fighter Ace. London UK, Grub Street Publishing. 

Aerial victories of Beaulieu-Marconnay, Olivier Freiherr von
Beaulieu-Marconnay, Olivier Freiherr von